Péter Galambos (born 9 September 1986) is a Hungarian rower. He won the silver medal in the lightweight single sculls
at the 2012 World Rowing Championships. Galambos studies economics and management at Óbuda University in Budapest.

References

External links

1986 births
Living people
Hungarian male rowers
World Rowing Championships medalists for Hungary
People from Vác
Sportspeople from Pest County